Erling Bjarne Johnson (7 June 1893 – 5 November 1967) invented the nitrophosphate process in the years 1927-28. The process is recognised internationally as important in the production of fertiliser, but he is little-known in his native Norway.

Johnson worked as a chemical engineer, graduating from Kristiania Tekniske Skole ("Kristiania School of Technics") in 1913. He continued his amanuensis at the chemical institute of the Norwegian University of Life Sciences from 1913 to 1916, where he was assistant to Professor Sebelien. His work concentrated on questions around fertilisers.

He worked as a research chemist for the North Western Cyanamide Company in Odda from 1915 to 1921, where he also worked on fertilisers. He sat on the State Raw Materials Committee in 1921. He was chemical and technical lead for A/S Monopol paint factory in Florvåg on Askøy in Bergen, at the same time as working with Jakobsens Fabrikker A/S in Oslo from 1921 to 1924. He was head chemist at Odda Smelteverk A/S from 1925. Johnson was one of the foremost chemists at Odda Smelteverk. He worked there until 1963, when he retired.

In 1964, Johnson was awarded the Guldberg og Waage-medaljen by the Norwegian Chemical Society.

References 
 Bassøe, Bjarne: Ingeniørmatrikkelen: norske sivilingeniører 1901-55 : med tillegg, Oslo 1961.
 Johnson, Erling: Dicyandiamidets innflydelse på Planteveksten (1918). Avhandling prisbelønnet i 1920 av 1905 fondet for Landbruksforskning i Norge. 
 Johnson, Erling: Omkring den nyere utvikling av kunstgjødselindustrien. Nye fremgangsmaater til fremstilling av koncentrerte kunstgjødselblandinger. Foredrag ved det 2. landsmøte for ingeniører M.N.I.F. NIF Bergens avdeling 50 års jubileum, Bergen 22-24. August 1930. 
 Sogner, Knut: The Case of Hafslund and the Odda Process. In Travis, Anthony S. (ed.): Determinants in the Evolution of the European Chemical Industry, 1900—1939 New Technologies, Political Frameworks, Markets and Companies, Dordrecht 1998.

Norwegian chemists
1893 births
1967 deaths